Zasia binti Sirin (born 24 September 1956) is a Bruneian former politician. In 2011 she was one of the first two women appointed to the Legislative Council, serving as a member until 2016.

Biography
Binti Sirin was born in Brunei in 1956. She earned a BA and an MA in Islamic studies at Al-Azhar University in Egypt. After returning to Brunei, she entered the civil service in 1980, initially working as a religious officer. She rose to become director of the Islamic Preaching Centre.

In 2011 binti Sirin was appointed to the Legislative Council as a representative of 'people who have achieved excellence'. She and Salbiah binti Sulaiman were the first female members of the Legislative Council. She remained a member until 2016.

References

1956 births
Living people
Al-Azhar University alumni
Bruneian civil servants
Bruneian women in politics
Members of the Legislative Council of Brunei
21st-century women politicians